Chavagnac may refer to the following:

People

 Henri-Louis de Chavagnac (166 –1743) was a French naval officer
 Michel-Joseph Gentil de Chavagnac (1770–1846), French chansonnier and playwright

Places in France

 Chavagnac, Cantal, a commune of the Cantal département
 Chavagnac, Dordogne, a commune of the Dordogne département